Kyrklund is a surname. Notable people with the surname include:

Kyra Kyrklund (born 1951), Finnish dressage rider and trainer
Willy Kyrklund (1921–2009), Finnish writer